General elections were held in Cuba on 31 December 1901. Tomás Estrada Palma won the presidential election, and Luis Estévez y Romero was elected Vice President. The National Party emerged as the largest party in the House of Representatives, winning 27 of the 63 seats. Voter turnout was 63.5%.

Results

President

Senate

House of Representatives

References

Cuba
General
Presidential elections in Cuba
Parliamentary elections in Cuba
Cuba
Election and referendum articles with incomplete results